Mark Frith is a journalist.

Mark Frith may also refer to:

Mark Frith (musician)

See also 
 Mark Firth, English industrialist